The Zymoetz River is a tributary of the Skeena River in the Canadian province of British Columbia.

Course
The Zymoetz River (local name "Copper River") originates in the Coast Mountains and flows generally south and west to join the Skeena River just east of Terrace, British Columbia.

Gallery

See also
 List of British Columbia rivers

References

Rivers of British Columbia
Range 5 Coast Land District